The 1983 NCAA Division I Wrestling Championships were the 53rd NCAA Division I Wrestling Championships to be held. The University of Oklahoma and Oklahoma State University co-hosted the tournament in Norman, Oklahoma and Stillwater, Oklahoma at the McCasland Field House and Gallagher Hall.

Iowa took home the team championship with 155 points and having four individual champions.

Mike Sheets of Oklahoma State was named the Most Outstanding Wrestler and Lou Banach of Iowa received the Gorriaran Award.

Team results

Individual finals

References

NCAA Division I Wrestling Championship
NCAA
Wrestling competitions in the United States
NCAA Division I  Wrestling Championships
NCAA Division I  Wrestling Championships
NCAA Division I  Wrestling Championships